General Scott may refer to:

United Kingdom
Charles Rochfort Scott (1797–1872), British Army major general
Francis Cunningham Scott (1834–1902), British Army major general
James Scott (British Army officer, died 1747) (c. 1672–1747), British Army lieutenant general
James Bruce Scott (1892-1974), British Indian Army major general
James Scott, 1st Duke of Monmouth (1649–1685), Dutch-born English Army general
John Scott (British Army officer) (1725–1775), British Army major general
Michael Scott (British Army officer) (born 1941), British Army major general
Thomas Scott (British Army officer) (1905-1976), British Army major general
William Henry Scott (British Army officer), (1789–1868), British Army general

United States
Charles Scott (governor), (1739-1813), Continental Army major general
Hugh L. Scott (1853-1934), U.S. Army  major general and Chief of Staff
John Alden Scott (1916–1986), U.S. Marine Reserves brigadier general 
Robert Lee Scott Jr. (1908–2006), U.S. Air Force brigadier general
Robert Kingston Scott (1826–1900), Union Army brigadier general and brevet major general
John Morin Scott (1730–1784), Continental Army brigadier general
Thomas M. Scott (1829–1876), Confederate States Army brigadier general
Tom William Scott (1902–1988), U.S. Air Force brigadier general
Willard Warren Scott Jr. (1926–2009), U.S. Army lieutenant general 
Winfield Scott (1786-1866), U.S. Army lieutenant general
Winfield W. Scott Jr. (born 1927), U.S. Air Force lieutenant general
Winfield W. Scott III (fl. 1970s–2000s), U.S. Air Force major general

See also
David Scott-Barrett (1922–2003), British Army lieutenant general
George Kenneth Scott-Moncrieff (1855–1924), British Army major general
James Scott-Elliot (1902–1996), British Army major general
Logan Scott-Bowden (1920–2014), British Army major general
Robert Scott-Kerr (1859–1942), British Army brigadier general
Attorney General Scott (disambiguation)